Inekak (also Romanized as Īnekak and Īnekek; also known as Enekek and Engak) is a village in Sardasht Rural District, in the Central District of Lordegan County, Chaharmahal and Bakhtiari Province, Iran. At the 2006 census, its population was 153, in 23 families. The village is populated by Lurs.

References 

Populated places in Lordegan County
Luri settlements in Chaharmahal and Bakhtiari Province